Chirixalus nongkhorensis, also known as the Nongkhor Asian treefrog, Nongkhor pigmy tree frog, Nong Khor bushfrog, and Nongkhor foam-nest treefrog, is a species of frog in the family Rhacophoridae. It is found in north-eastern India (Assam), Myanmar, Thailand, Cambodia, Laos, Vietnam, and Peninsular Malaysia.

Habitat and conservation
Breeding takes place around the rainy season adjacent to still bodies of water; the eggs are laid in foam nests attached to the underside of leaves overhanging water, to which the tadpoles drop upon hatching.

This species could be threatened by forests loss, although it appears quite adaptable. It is present in a number of protected areas.

References 

nongkhorensis
Amphibians of Cambodia
Frogs of India
Amphibians of Laos
Amphibians of Malaysia
Amphibians of Myanmar
Amphibians of Thailand
Amphibians of Vietnam
Amphibians described in 1927
Taxa named by Doris Mable Cochran
Taxonomy articles created by Polbot